A shielded data link connector is a type of electrical connector in which the signal pins are surrounded by a metal shield. The connector was designed by AMP (now TE Connectivity) and is available with a range of pins (4 to 16).

It has been used by several different products, most notably on the original IBM Model M keyboard with a detachable cable, on the IBM SurePos line of devices, and on HP HIL devices (such as keyboards and mice). The connector was also used by AMF for their line of Accuscore automatic scoring systems for bowling. Some of the SDL connectors are still manufactured but are no longer common on consumer electronic devices.

See also
 Modular connector

External links
 Tyco catalogue entry for SDL connectors

Electrical signal connectors